Zagrad is a village in the Municipality of Škocjan in southeastern Slovenia. It lies northwest of Škocjan in the historical region of Lower Carniola. Within the municipality, it is the administrative centre of the Village Community of Zagrad. The municipality is now included in the Southeast Slovenia Statistical Region.

References

External links
Zagrad at Geopedia

Populated places in the Municipality of Škocjan